Lee Duxbury (born 7 October 1969) is an English former professional footballer who played as a midfielder. He was previously manager of non-league Eccleshill United.

Playing career
Born in Skipton, Duxbury played in the Football League for Bradford City, Rochdale, Huddersfield Town, Oldham Athletic and Bury, making nearly 600 career appearances.

Duxbury signed for Harrogate Town in September 2004, for Farsley Celtic in October 2004, and for Glenavon in January 2006.

Duxbury is a survivor of 1985 Bradford City stadium fire.

Coaching career
Duxbury was a coach at Oldham Athletic, before becoming manager of non-league Eccleshill United.

References

1969 births
Living people
People from Skipton
English footballers
Association football midfielders
Bradford City A.F.C. players
Rochdale A.F.C. players
Huddersfield Town A.F.C. players
Oldham Athletic A.F.C. players
Oldham Athletic A.F.C. non-playing staff
Bury F.C. players
Harrogate Town A.F.C. players
Farsley Celtic A.F.C. players
Glenavon F.C. players
English Football League players
English football managers
Eccleshill United F.C. managers